Rajasthan Tourism Development Corporation (RTDC) is an agency of the Government of Rajasthan set up on 1 April 1979 to develop tourism in the Indian state. It manages many restaurants, cafeterias, hotels and bars. The Corporation also organises package tours, fairs, festivals, entertainment, shopping and transport services. In collaboration with Indian Railways it runs the luxury tourist train Palace on Wheels. RTDC has hotels/motels at all major tourist places in Rajasthan.

References

External links

Tourism in Rajasthan
State agencies of Rajasthan
State tourism development corporations of India
1979 establishments in Rajasthan
Government agencies established in 1979